Oliver Eduardo Elliot Bañados (born June 19, 1987) is a Chilean freestyle swimmer. He competed at the 2008 Summer Olympics.

In 2008, he joined the Pontifical Catholic University of Valparaíso School of Physical Education.

References

External links
 

Living people
Swimmers at the 2008 Summer Olympics
Olympic swimmers of Chile
Chilean male freestyle swimmers
1987 births
Swimmers at the 2011 Pan American Games
Sportspeople from Viña del Mar
Swimmers at the 2019 Pan American Games
Pan American Games competitors for Chile
Pontifical Catholic University of Valparaíso alumni
21st-century Chilean people